The 1999 Furman Paladins football team was an American football team that represented Furman University as a member of the Southern Conference (SoCon) during the 1999 NCAA Division I-AA football season. In their sixth year under head coach Bobby Johnson, the Paladins compiled an overall record of 9–3 with a conference mark of 7–1, sharing the SoCon title with Appalachian State and Georgia Southern. Furman advanced to the NCAA Division I-AA Football Championship playoffs, where they were upset by UMass in the first round.

Schedule

References

Furman
Furman Paladins football seasons
Southern Conference football champion seasons
Furman Paladins football